Paola Ogechi Egonu (born 18 December 1998) is an Italian volleyball player. She plays for Turkish volleyball club VakıfBank S.K. and was part of the Italy women's national volleyball team until 2022 when she considered leaving the team allegedly due to racism.

She participated at the 2018 Montreux Volley Masters, 2018 FIVB Volleyball World Championship, and 2018 FIVB Volleyball Women's Nations League.

At club level she played for Club Italia in 2015. She was selected to play in the Italian League All-Star game in 2017. In 2017, she moved to AGIL Novara.

She was awarded the prize for Woman of the Year 2019 by D - la Repubblica delle donne, a weekly magazine of La Repubblica.

She was one of the flagbearers of the Olympic Flag at the 2020 Summer Games in Tokyo.

Personal life
Egonu was born in Cittadella, in Veneto, to Nigerian parents. Her father, Ambrose, is Igbo from Imo State and her mother, Eunice, from Benin City. She has two siblings, Angela and Andrea. Her cousin Terry Enweonwu is a volleyball player as well.

In November 2018, in an interview for the Corriere della Sera, she came out, revealing to have a girlfriend that comforted her after the defeat at the 2018 FIVB Volleyball Women's World Championship. Later on, her girlfriend's name was revealed: she is the volleyball player Katarzyna Skorupa.

In 2020, she dubbed the character Dreamerwind (italian: Sognaluna Dibrezza), originally voiced by Cathy Cavadini, for the Italian version of the animation movie Soul, produced by Disney and Pixar.

In the season 2020-2021, she co-presented the italian show Le Iene.

After the conclusion of the 2022 FIVB World Championship, Egonu was captured on video telling her manager: "This is my last game with the national team." This came following the bronze medal match against the United States, leading to speculation that she was quitting the team. She later confirmed these reports, stating she is considering taking an indefinite pause from the team due to persistent racism she faces.

Awards

Clubs
 2017 Italian Supercup -  Champion, with Igor Gorgonzola Novara
 2017-18 Italian Cup (Coppa Italia) -  Champion, with Igor Gorgonzola Novara
 2018-19 Italian Cup (Coppa Italia) -  Champion, with Igor Gorgonzola Novara
 2018–19 CEV Women's Champions League -  Champion, with AGIL Novara
 2019 Italian Supercup -  Champion, with Imoco Volley Conegliano
 2019 FIVB Volleyball Women's Club World Championship -  Champion, with Imoco Volley Conegliano
 2019-20 Italian Cup (Coppa Italia) -  Champion, with Imoco Volley Conegliano
 2020 Italian Supercup -  Champions, with Imoco Volley Conegliano
 2020-21 Italian Cup (Coppa Italia) -  Champion, with Imoco Volley Conegliano
 2020–21 Italian League -  Champion, with Imoco Volley Conegliano
 2020–21 CEV Women's Champions League -  Champion, with Imoco Volley Conegliano
 2021 Italian Supercup -  Champions, with Imoco Volley Conegliano
 2021-22 Italian Cup (Coppa Italia) -  Champion, with Imoco Volley Conegliano
 2021–22 Italian League -  Champion, with Imoco Volley Conegliano

Individuals
 2015 U18 World Championship MVP
 2015 U18 World Championship Best Outside Spiker
 2016 Europe Olympic Qualification Tournament "Best Outside Spiker"
 2016–17 Italian League "Top Scorer"
 2017-18 Italian Cup (Coppa Italia) "Most Valuable Player"
 2018 Montreux Volley Masters "Most Valuable Player"
 2018 FIVB World Championship "Best Opposite Hitters"
 CEV Champions League 2018–19 "Most Valuable Player"
 2018–19 Italian League "Top Scorer" 
 2019 Italian Supercup "Most Valuable Player"
 2019 FIVB Volleyball Women's Club World Championship "Most Valuable Player"
 2020-21 Italian Cup (Coppa Italia) "Most Valuable Player"
 2020–21 Italian League "Most Valuable Player"
 CEV Champions League 2020–21 "Most Valuable Player"
 CEV EuroVolley 2021 "Most Valuable Player"
 2021 European Volleyball Confederation "Female Volleyball Player of the Year 2021"
 2021–22 Italian League "Most Valuable Player"
 2021-22 Italian Cup (Coppa Italia) "Most Valuable Player"
 2021–22 Italian League "Top Scorer" 
 2022 FIVB Nations League - "Best Opposite Hitter"
 2022 FIVB Nations League - "Most Valuable Player"

References

1998 births
Living people
Italian women's volleyball players
Italian people of Nigerian descent
Italian sportspeople of African descent
Sportspeople of Nigerian descent
People from Cittadella
Volleyball players at the 2016 Summer Olympics
Olympic volleyball players of Italy
Italian LGBT sportspeople
Bisexual women
LGBT volleyball players
Serie A1 (women's volleyball) players
Volleyball players at the 2020 Summer Olympics
Sportspeople from the Province of Padua
VakıfBank S.K. volleyballers
Italian expatriate sportspeople in Turkey
Expatriate volleyball players in Turkey